Proeulia limaria is a species of moth of the family Tortricidae. It is found in Coquimbo Region, Chile.

The wingspan is 23 mm. The ground colour of the forewings is cream white, suffused with pale ochreous cream and cream, sprinkled with brownish grey, grey and brownish in the dorsal portion of the wing. The hindwings are cream, in the basal half mixed with pale brownish.

Etymology
The species name refers to the Limarí Province.

References

Moths described in 2010
Proeulia
Moths of South America
Taxa named by Józef Razowski
Endemic fauna of Chile